Tibor Bábik (born 12 November 1973 in Paks) is a Hungarian football (defender) player who has spent most of his career playing for Paksi SE.

References

External links
Player profile at HLSZ 

1973 births
Living people
People from Paks
Hungarian footballers
Association football defenders
Paksi FC players
Vác FC players
Palotás SE footballers
Szolnoki MÁV FC footballers
Nyíregyháza Spartacus FC players
Budapest Honvéd FC players
Jászapáti VSE footballers
Sportspeople from Tolna County